The British television channel Hum Europe has been broadcasting a range of entertainment content since 2014, chiefly designed for British Pakistani viewers.

Current programming

Note: Titles are listed in alphabetical order.

Daily soaps

Drama serials

Hum Europe Exclusives

Former programming

Serials

Deewar-e-Shab (2019)
Jo Tu Chahey (2019)
Anaa (2019)
Bharam (2019)
Meer Abru (2019)
Mere Humdam (2019)
Chhoti Chhoti Baatein (2019)
Ishq Zahe Naseeb (2019)
Inkaar (2019)
Khaas (2019)
Jaal (2019)
 Log Kia Kahengay (2019)
 Soya Mera Naseeb (2019)De Ijazat Jo Tu (2019)Ghundi (2019)Madiha Maliha (2019)Love Ke Liye (2019)
 Mannchalay (2019)
 Bilqees Kaur (2014)
 Shareek e Hayat (2014)
 Kisay Apna Khainy (2014)
 Kahani Raima Aur Manahil Ki (2014)
 Kitni Girhain Baqi hai (2014)
 Mein Diwani (2014)
 Ishq Me Tere (2014)
 Shab e Zindagi (2014)
 Zindagi Tere Bina (2014)
 Bunty I Love You (2014)
 Laa (2014)
 Janam Jali (2014)
 Aahista Aahista (2014)
 Mohabbat Ab Nahi Hogi (2014)
 Mausam (2014)
 Mitthu Aur Aapa (2014)
 Mere Meherban (2014)
 Do Saal Ki Aurat (2014)
 Shanakht (2014)
 Daay Ijazat Jo Tu (2014)
 Firaaq (2014)
 Darbadar Teray Liye (2014-2015)
 Tum Mere Hi Rehna (2014-2015)
 Mehram (2014-2015)
 Digest Writer (2014-2015)
 Humsafar (2014-2015)Parsa (2015)
 Sadqay Tumhare (2014-2015)
 Shehr-e-Zaat (2015)
 Aik Pal (TV series) (2014-2015)
 Zindagi Tum Ho (2014-2015)
 Zid (2014-2015)
 Meray Khuda (2015)
 Na Kaho Tum Mere Nahi (2015)
 Nikah (2015)
 Alvida (2015)
 Dil Ka Kiya Rung Karon (2015)
 Mera Naseeb (2015)
 Aye Zindagi (2015)
 Jugnoo (2015)
 Man-O-Salwa (2015)
 Muqaddas (2015)
 Yahan Pyar Nahi Hai (2015)
 Malaal (2015)
 Karb (2015)
 Dayar-e-Dil (2015)
 Mol (2015)
 Kadoorat (2015)
 Kitna Satatay Ho (2015)
 Tum Mere Paas Raho (2015)
 Mohabbat Aag Si (2015)
 Tumhari Natasha (2015) Kaisay Tumse Kaho (2015)
 Muje Apna Bana Lo (2015)
 Aik Thi Misaal (September 2015-January 2016)
 ''Tumhare Siwa (2015-2016)
 Tere Baghair (2015-2016)
 Sangat (2015-2016)
 Preet Na Kariyo Koi (2015-2016)
 Kahi Unkahi (2016)
 Gul-e-Rana (2015-2016)
 Humnasheen (2016)
 Maana Ka Gharana (2015-2016)
 Mastana Mahi (2016)
 Kisay Chahoon (2016)
 Mata e Jaan Hai Tu (2016)
 Maan (2015-2016)
 Lagao (2016)
 Sehra Main Safar (2015-2016)
 Tere Mere Beech (2015-2016)
 Abro (2015-2016)
 Mohabbat Rooth Jaye Toh (2016)
 Dil-e-Beqarar (April–August 2016)
 Akbari Asghari (May–August 2016)
 Pakeeza (February–August 2016)
 Aseerzadi (July–August 2016)
 Mann Mayal (January 2016-September 2016)
 Zara Yaad Kar (March 2016-September 2016)
 Khawab Sarae (May–September 2016)
 Udaari (April–September 2016) 
 Ek Tamanna Lahasil Si (August–October 2016)
 Jhoot (May–October 2016)
 Dharkan (June–October 2016)
 Kathputli (June–October 2016)
 Deewana (May–November 2016)
 Maat (August–November 2016)
 Saiqa (October–November 2016)
 Laaj (July–November 2016)
 Khoya Khoya Chand (November–December 2016)
 Hatheli (September 2016-January 2017)
 Bin Roye (October 2016-January 2017)
 Sanam (September 2016-February 2017)
 Saya-e-Dewar Bhi Nahi (August 2016-February 2017)
 Sila (October 2016-March 2017)
 Sang-e-Mar Mar (September 2016-March 2017)
 Dil Banjaara (October 2016-March 2017)
 Kuch Na Kaho (October 2016-April 2017)
 Choti Si Zindagi (September 2016-April 2017)
 Kuch Na Kaho (2016 TV series) (October 2016 - April 2017)
 Nazr-e-Bad (January 2017 - June 2017)
 Naatak (December 2016 - June 2017)
 Sammi (January 2017 - June 2017)
 Dil-e-Jaanam (March 2017 - July 2017)
 Phir Wohi Mohabbat (March 2017 - August 2017)
 Yeh Raha Dil (February 2017 - August 2017)
 Kitni Girhain Baaki Hain (October 2016 - August 2017)
 Mohabbat Khawab Safar (April 2017 - August 2017) 
 Woh Aik Pal (March 2017 - September 2017) 
 Adhi Gawahi (July 2017 - October 2017)
 Yaqeen Ka Safar (April 2017 - November 2017)
 Neelam Kinaray (September 2017 - December 2017)
 Gumrah (September 2017 - January 2018)
 Pagli(August 2017 - January 2018)
 Daldal(August 2017 - February 2018)
 Alif Allah Aur Insaan(April 2017 - February 2018)
 Mein Maa Nahi Banna Chahti (October 2017 - February 2018)
 Tumhari Maryam (June 2017 - February 2018)
 Toh Dil Ka Kia Hua (July 2017 - February 2018)
 O Rangreza (July 2017 - February 2018)
 Dar Si Jati Hai Sila (November 2017 - April 2018)
 De Ijazat (January 2018 - May 2018)
 Khamoshi (September 2017– June 2018)
  Teri Meri Kahani(February 2018 - June 2018)
 Mah e Tamaam (January–August 2018)
 Tabeer (February–August 2018)
 Zun Mureed (March–September 2018)
 Ishq Tamasha (February–September 2018)

Soap operas

 Rungeelay (2014)
 Dramay Bazain (2014-2015)
 Dil Ka Darwaza (2014)
 Halka Na Lo (2014-2015)
 Love Ke Liye (2014)
 Hum Theray Gunahgar (2014)
 Munchalay (2014)
 Agar Tum Na Hotay (2014-2015)
 Susraal Mera (2014-2015)
 Choti Si Ghalat Fehmi (2015)
 Sartaj Mera Tu Raaj Mera (2015)
 Aasi (2015)
 Perfume Chowk (2014-2015)
 Ishq Ibadat (2015)
 Akeli (2015)
 Mera Dard Na Janay Koi (2015-2016)
 Ishq-e-Benaam Zindagi Tujh Ko Jiya (2016)
 Jahan Ara Begum 2016
 Sawaab 2016
 Haya Ke Daaman Main (March 2016-September 2016)
 Namak Paray (April–October 2016)
 Bay Aitebaar (July–December 2016)
 Bad Gumaan (September 2016-February 2017)
 Fun Khana (2017)
 Gila (December 2016-March 2017)
 Ladkiyan Mohallay Ki (July 2016-March 2017)
 Jithani (2017)
 Sangsar (2017)
 Mohabbat Mushkil Hai (July 2017)
 Samdhan (2017)
 Thori Si Wafa (2017-18)
 Naseebon Jali (2017-18)
 Maa Sadqay (2018)

Horror/Supernatural series
 Woh Dubara (2014)
 Belapur Ki Dayan (February 2018 - June 2018)

Anthology series
 Kitni Girhain Baqi Hain (2011)
 Shareek-e-Hayat (2014)
 Ustani Jee (2018)

Other
 Jashn-e-Ramzan
 Noor-e-Ramzan 
 Ramzan Kay Chatharay 
 Chef's Fusion
 The Continental Cook
 Sirat e Mustaqeem
 Iftaar Package
 Hadees e Nabvi
 Asma Ul Husna
 Suno Chanda

External links
 Hum TV's official channel on Youtube
 Hum TV's official Facebook page
 
 Hum TV's official website
 Hum TV's official channel on Dailymotion
 Hum TV's official video channel

Hum TV
Hum
Hum